The Qafë Bar Prison was a political prison in Communist Albania at the village of Qafë Bar.

References

See also
Forced labour camps in Communist Albania
Prison of Burrel

People's Socialist Republic of Albania
Prisons in Albania